The St. Pauli Piers (often only referred to as Landungsbrücken), is the largest landing site in the Port of Hamburg, Germany, and also one of Hamburg's major tourist attractions. Other English language translations include St. Pauli Landing Stages or St. Pauli Landing Bridges.

The piers are located in the St. Pauli area of Hamburg, between the lower harbour and the Fischmarkt (Fish Market), on the banks of the Elbe river. The Landungsbrücken today form a central transportation hub, with S-Bahn, U-Bahn and ferry stations, and are also a major tourist magnet with numerous restaurants and departure points for harbour pleasure boats. There is an entrance to the Old Elbe tunnel at the western end of the Landungsbrücken. The eastern end of the building complex is marked by the Pegelturm (water level tower). Halfway up the tower, there is a water level indicator built into the wall, which indicates the current stage of the tides.

Shipping piers
The first pier here was built in 1839 at what was then the edge of the harbour. It served as a terminal for steamships, which could be relatively easily filled with coal here. The pier ensured a sufficient security distance from the city, since these ships were fueled by coal which presented a fire risk. The current piers built in 1907 consist of floating pontoons, which are accessible from land by ten movable bridges.

Among others, the great Hapag-Lloyd liners landed here. Today only the HADAG ferries, harbour tour ships and motor launches, passenger ships serving the lower Elbe, and catamarans to Stade and Helgoland still travel to the piers. Ships travel from here daily to the musical island of the concert, "The Lion King".

The old piers were destroyed during the Second World War, so today's pontoons were rebuilt between 1953 and 1955. The last section destroyed in the War, between bridges 2 and 3, was not rebuilt until 1976. During the modernisation begun in 1999, the roofing and lighting were updated. Part of this modernisation is planned to include replacing bridge 7.

Cultural monument
The terminal building, built from volcanic tuff, and the piers were constructed between 1907 and 1909 in the same location as the old Landungsbrücken. It was designed as a representative shipping station by the architectural company of Raabe & Wöhlecke for the department  of river and harbour construction of the construction deputation. With its length of 205 m, its numerous gateways to the ships' piers, its domes and towers, it sets a structural accent. The architectural sculptures were created by Arthur Bock.

The complex was classified as a historical monument on 15 September 2003.

Public transport interchange

A connection with the S-Bahn and U-Bahn is provided through Landungsbrücken station.

Stammsiel
One of Hamburg's oldest and largest sewerage systems is near the Landungsbrücken. It is part of the "Stadtwasserkunst" designed by William Lindley in 1842. The Geest-Stammsiel collects sewage from far parts of the city before it is transported under the Elbe to the main purification plant Köhlbrandhöft on the opposite side of the Elbe, by means of a pumping station about 100 m upstream of the old Elbe tunnel. The sluice can be travelled by boat. For the rowing trips of Kaiser Willhelm II, a separate underground dock was constructed, viewable by appointment.

Notes

References

External links 

 Live Webcams at St. Pauli Piers
 Pictures of the St. Pauli Piers
 St. Pauli Landungsbrücken interest group 

Transport in Hamburg
Ferry terminals

Geography of Hamburg
1839 establishments in Germany
Tourist attractions in Hamburg
Buildings and structures in Hamburg-Mitte
1909 architecture
Transport infrastructure completed in 1909